Phu Ruea, is a 1365 m high mountain in Loei province, Thailand. It is in Phu Ruea district. This mountain is part of the Phetchabun Mountains, a massif forming a natural boundary between northern Thailand and Isan. The peak rises seven kilometers north of Highway 203, between Loei town and Phetchabun. The name of the mountain comes from the fact that it looks like an upside down boat from certain angles.

The Phu Ruea High Altitude Agricultural Research Station is on the mountain  and Phu Ruea National Park encompasses the peak. The park borders Sainyabuli province in Laos at its northern end. Most of the mountain is covered in mixed evergreen forest. The area around the mountain is part of the Luang Prabang montane rain forests ecoregion.

See also
List of mountains in Thailand
Loei province

References

External links
Thai geography: Isan northern and eastern riparian belt

Phu Rua National Park Official Website
Phu Ruea High Altitude Agricultural Research Station,Phu Ruea,Loei

Geography of Loei province
Mountains of Thailand
Phetchabun Mountains